Beckville is a neighborhood of Piedmont, Missouri. It was formerly an independent unincorporated community. 

The community has the name of Louis Beck, a first settler. A variant name was "Carters".

References

Populated places in Wayne County, Missouri